This article is about the particular significance of the year 1859 to Wales and its people.

Incumbents

Lord Lieutenant of Anglesey – Henry Paget, 2nd Marquess of Anglesey 
Lord Lieutenant of Brecknockshire – John Lloyd Vaughan Watkins
Lord Lieutenant of Caernarvonshire – Sir Richard Williams-Bulkeley, 10th Baronet 
Lord Lieutenant of Cardiganshire – Edward Pryse
Lord Lieutenant of Carmarthenshire – John Campbell, 1st Earl Cawdor 
Lord Lieutenant of Denbighshire – Robert Myddelton Biddulph   
Lord Lieutenant of Flintshire – Sir Stephen Glynne, 9th Baronet
Lord Lieutenant of Glamorgan – Christopher Rice Mansel Talbot
Lord Lieutenant of Merionethshire – Robert Davies Pryce 
Lord Lieutenant of Monmouthshire – Capel Hanbury Leigh
Lord Lieutenant of Montgomeryshire – Thomas Hanbury-Tracy, 2nd Baron Sudeley  
Lord Lieutenant of Pembrokeshire – Sir John Owen, 1st Baronet
Lord Lieutenant of Radnorshire – John Walsh, 1st Baron Ormathwaite

Bishop of Bangor – Christopher Bethell (until 9 April); James Colquhoun Campbell (from 14 June) 
Bishop of Llandaff – Alfred Ollivant 
Bishop of St Asaph – Thomas Vowler Short 
Bishop of St Davids – Connop Thirlwall

Events

January - Y Brython changes from weekly to monthly publication.
February - First race at Bangor-on-Dee racecourse.
1 April - Opening of the Corris Railway.
5 April - 27 men are killed by flooding at Neath Chain Colliery.
31 May - U.K. general election. This is the last general election in which the Conservative Party's vote share in Wales exceeds that in England.
29 June - Benjamin Hall is raised to the peerage as 1st Baron Llanover.
15 October–17 October - Queen Victoria stays at Penrhyn Castle.
25 October–26 October - 'Royal Charter Storm':
Steam clipper Royal Charter is wrecked off the north-east Anglesey coast, with the estimated loss of around 459 lives, the greatest loss of life in any maritime accident in Welsh waters.
St Brynach's Church, Cwm-yr-Eglwys, is destroyed.
Peak year for copper production in Wales.
The final stage of the East Bute Dock, Cardiff, is completed and opened.
Merger of Yr Amserau and Baner Cymru.
Religious revival led by Humphrey Jones.
The Cymanfa Ganu movement is launched in Aberdare.
Sir Charles Morgan, 3rd Baronet, is created Baron Tredegar.

Arts and literature

Awards
Lewis William Lewis (Llew Llwyfo) wins the chair at the Merthyr Tydfil eisteddfod.

New books
Hugh Hughes (Tegai) - Y Drydedd Oruchwyliaeth
Nathaniel Jones - Fy Awenydd
Richard Parry (Gwalchmai) - Adgofion am John Elias
Thomas Stephens & Gweirydd ap Rhys - Orgraff yr Iaith Gymraeg
William Thomas (Gwilym Marles) - Prydyddiaeth

Music
John Roberts (Ieuan Gwyllt) - Llyfr Tonau Cynulleidfaol

Births
11 January - Sir Joseph Alfred Bradney, historian (died 1933)
29 January - Sir George Lockwood Morris, industrialist and Welsh international rugby player (died 1947)
7 February - Frank Hancock, Wales international rugby union international (died 1943)
16 February - T. E. Ellis, politician (died 1899)
18 April - Sir Evan Davies Jones, 1st Baronet, civil engineer (died 1949)
4 May - Sir Samuel Thomas Evans, politician and judge (died 1918)
22 May - Jonathan Ceredig Davies, travel writer (died 1932)
17 July - Ernest Rhys, writer (died 1946)
11 Oct – Aneurin Williams, politician (died 1924)
5 December - Edward John Lewis, Wales international rugby union player (died 1925)
7 December - Leonard Watkins, Wales international rugby union player (died 1901)
25 December - John Goulstone Lewis Wales international rugby union player (died 1935)
November - Richard Bell, politician (died 1930)

Deaths
19 January - Charles Vachell, alderman and former mayor of Cardiff, 75 
19 April – Christopher Bethell, Bishop of Bangor, 85
20 May - Thomas Penson the younger, county surveyor of Denbighshire, 69
21 June - John Bowen, Bishop of Sierra Leone, 43 (yellow fever)
8 July - John Thomas (Siôn Wyn o Eifion), poet, 78
10 September - Sir John Hay Williams, landowner, 65
24 September – Joseph Murray Ince, painter, 53
October - Evan Jones (Ifan y Gorlan), harpist

References

 
Wales